Marko Šćepanović (born 8 August 1982) is a Montenegrin retired footballer. He scored 14 goals in 28 matches in Montenegrin First League 2012–13.

Club career

Persepolis
He came to Iran on 1 July 2013 and also trained with the team for three days and participated in a friendly match with Persepolis shirt. Finally he joined Persepolis on 4 July.

Club statistics

 Assist Goals

References

External links
Profile at FK Mladost website
Profile at HLSZ

Football

1982 births
Living people
Footballers from Podgorica
Association football midfielders
Serbia and Montenegro footballers
Montenegrin footballers
FK Iskra Danilovgrad players
FK Budućnost Podgorica players
OFK Titograd players
Barcsi SC footballers
Pécsi MFC players
Persepolis F.C. players
Second League of Serbia and Montenegro players
Montenegrin First League players
Nemzeti Bajnokság I players
Persian Gulf Pro League players
Montenegrin Second League players
Montenegrin expatriate footballers
Expatriate footballers in Hungary
Montenegrin expatriate sportspeople in Hungary
Expatriate footballers in Iran
Montenegrin expatriate sportspeople in Iran